Polish orthography is the system of writing the Polish language. The language is written using the Polish alphabet, which derives from the Latin alphabet, but includes some additional letters with diacritics. The orthography is mostly phonetic, or rather phonemic—the written letters (or combinations of them) correspond in a consistent manner to the sounds, or rather the phonemes, of spoken Polish. For detailed information about the system of phonemes, see Polish phonology.

Polish alphabet

The diacritics used in the Polish alphabet are the kreska (graphically similar to the acute accent) in the letters ć, ń, ó, ś, ź; the kreska ukośna (stroke) in the letter ł; the kropka (overdot) in the letter ż; and the ogonek ("little tail") in the letters ą, ę. There are 32 letters (or 35 letters, if the foreign letters q, v, x are included) in the Polish alphabet: 9 vowels and 23 or 26 consonants.

The letters q (named ku), v (named fau or rarely we), and x (named iks) are used in some foreign words and commercial names. In loanwords they are often replaced by kw, w, and (ks or gz), respectively (as in kwarc "quartz", weranda "veranda", ekstra "extra", egzosfera, "exosphere").

When giving the spelling of words, certain letters may be said in more emphatic ways to distinguish them from other identically pronounced characters. For example, H may be referred to as samo h ("h alone") to distinguish it from CH (ce ha). The letter Ż may be called "żet (or zet) z kropką" ("Ż with a dot") to distinguish it from RZ (er zet). The letter U may be called u otwarte ("open u", a reference to its graphical form) or u zwykłe ("regular u"), to distinguish it from Ó, which is sometimes called ó zamknięte ("closed ó"), ó kreskowane or ó z kreską ("ó with a stroke accent"), alternatively o kreskowane or o z kreską ("o with a stroke accent"). The letter ó is a relic from hundreds of years ago when there was a length distinction in Polish similar to that in Czech, with á and é also being common at the time. Subsequently, the length distinction disappeared and á and é were abolished, but ó came to be pronounced the same as u.

Note that Polish letters with diacritics are treated as fully independent letters in alphabetical ordering (unlike in languages such as French, Spanish, and German). For example, być comes after bycie. The diacritic letters also have their own sections in dictionaries (words beginning with ć are not usually listed under c). However, there are no regular words that begin with ą or ń.

Digraphs

Polish additionally uses the digraphs ch, cz, dz, dź, dż, rz, and sz. Combinations of certain consonants with the letter i before a vowel can be considered digraphs: ci as a positional variant of ć, si as a positional variant of ś, zi as a positional variant of ź, and ni as a positional variant of ń (but see a special remark on ni below); and there is also one trigraph dzi as a positional variant of dź. These are not given any special treatment in alphabetical ordering. For example, ch is treated simply as c followed by h, and not as a single letter as in Czech or Slovak (e.g. Chojnice only has its first letter capitalised, and is sorted after Canki and before Cieszyn).

Spelling rules

See below for rules regarding spelling of alveolo-palatal consonants.

H may be glottal  in a small number of dialects.

 Rarely,  is not a digraph and represents two separate sounds:
 in various forms of the verb zamarzać – "to freeze"
 in various forms of the verb mierzić – "to disgust"
 in the place name Murzasichle
 in borrowings, for example erzac (from German Ersatz), Tarzan

Voicing and devoicing
Voiced consonant letters frequently come to represent voiceless sounds (as shown in the above tables). The conditions for this neutralization are described under Voicing and devoicing in the article on Polish phonology.

Palatal and palatalized consonants

Special attention should be paid to  before  plus a vowel. For examples, see the table in the next section.

The spellings are thus  before , and  otherwise. In the system without the palatalized velars, they are analyzed as /k/, /ɡ/ and /x/ before /i/ and /kj/, /ɡj/ and /xj/ before other vowels.

Other issues with i and j
Except in the cases mentioned in the previous paragraph, the letter  if followed by another vowel in the same word usually represents , but it also has the palatalizing effect on the previous consonant. For example, pies ("dog") is pronounced . Some words with  before  plus a vowel also follow this pattern (see below).
The letter  normally appears in this position only after ,  and  if the palatalization effect described above has to be avoided (as in presja "pressure", Azja "Asia", lekcja "lesson", and the common suffixes -cja "-tion", -zja "-sion": stacja "station", wizja "vision"). The pronunciation of the sequence wja (in wjazd) is the same as the pronunciation of wia (in wiadro "bucket").

For example, dalii (genitive of dalia "dalia"), Bułgarii (genitive of Bułgaria "Bulgaria"), chemii (genitive of chemia "chemistry"), religii (genitive of religia "religion"), amfibii (genitive of amfibia "amphibia"). This is why children commonly misspell and write -i in the inflected forms as armii, Danii or hypercorrectly write ziemii instead of ziemi (words of Polish origin do not have the ending -ii but simple -i, e.g. ziemi, genitive of ziemia).

(The spelling Angli, very frequently met with on the Internet, is simply an error in orthography, caused by this pronunciation.)
 

For example (pay attention to the upper- and lower-case letters):

It appears only after c, s and z. Pronunciation of it as a simple  is considered a pronunciation error.

Nasal vowels

Homophonic spellings
Apart from the cases in the sections above, there are three sounds in Polish that can be spelt in two different ways, depending on the word. Those result from historical sound changes. The correct spelling can often be deduced from the spelling of other morphological forms of the word or cognates in Polish or in other Slavic languages.
  only occurs in loanwords; however, many of them have been nativized and are not perceived as loanwords.  is used:
 wahadło – waga
 druh – drużyna
 błahy – błazen
 when the same letter is used in the language from which the word was borrowed, e.g. Greek prefixes hekto-, hetero-, homo-, hipo-, hiper-, hydro-, also honor, historia, herbata, etc.
  is used:
 in all native words, e.g. chyba, chrust, chrapać, chować, chcieć
 when the same digraph is used in the language from which the word was borrowed, e.g. chór, echo, charakter, chronologia, etc.
  is used:
 usually at the beginning of a word (except for ósemka, ósmy, ów, ówczesny, ówdzie)
 always at the end of a word
 in the endings -uch, -ucha, -uchna, -uchny, -uga, -ula, -ulec, -ulek, -uleńka, -ulka, -ulo, -un, -unek, -uni, -unia, -unio, -ur, -us, -usi, -usieńki, -usia, -uszek, -uszka, -uszko, -uś, -utki
  is used:
 mróz – mrozu
 wiózł – wieźć
 skrócić – skracać
 in the endings -ów, -ówka, -ówna (except for zasuwka, skuwka, wsuwka)
Czech ).
  is used:
 może – mogę
 mosiężny – mosiądz
 drużyna – druh
 każe – kazać
 wożę – woźnica
 bliżej – blisko
 in the particle że, e.g. skądże, tenże, także
 lżej
 łże
 rżysko
 in loanwords, especially from French, e.g.:
 rewanż
 żakiet
 garaż
  is used:
 when cognate words or other morphological forms have the letter , e.g. morze – morski, karze – kara
 przygoda
 brzeg
 trzy
 drzewo
 krzywy
 grzywa
 chrzest
 ujrzeć
 wrzeć

Other points

There are certain clusters where a written consonant would not normally be pronounced.

Capitalization
Names are generally capitalized in Polish as in English. Polish does not capitalize the months and days of the week, nor adjectives and other forms derived from proper nouns (for example, angielski "English").

Titles such as pan ("Mr"), pani ("Mrs/Ms"), lekarz ("doctor"), etc. and their abbreviations are not capitalized, except in written polite address. Second-person pronouns are traditionally capitalized in formal writing (e.g. letters or official emails); so may be other words used to refer to someone directly in a formal setting, like Czytelnik ("reader", in newspapers or books). Third-person pronouns are capitalized to show reverence, most often in a sacred context.

Punctuation
Polish punctuation is similar to that of English. However, there are more rigid rules concerning use of commas—subordinate clauses are almost always marked off with a comma, while it is normally considered incorrect to use a comma before a coordinating conjunction with the meaning "and" (i, a or oraz).

Abbreviations (but not acronyms or initialisms) are followed by a period when they end with a letter other than the one which ends the full word. For example, dr has no period when it stands for doktor, but takes one when it stands for an inflected form such as doktora and prof. has period because it comes from profesor (professor).

Apostrophes are used to mark the elision of the final sound of foreign words not pronounced before Polish inflectional endings, as in Harry'ego (genitive of Harry  – the final  is elided in the genitive). However, it is often erroneously used to separate a loanword stem from any inflectional ending, for example, *John'a, which should be Johna (genitive of John; no sound is elided).

Quotation marks are used in different ways: either „ordinary Polish quotes” or «French quotes» (without space) for first level, and ‚single Polish quotes’ or «French quotes» for second level, which gives three styles of nested quotes:
 „Quote ‚inside’ quote”
 „Quote «inside» quote”
 «Quote ‚inside’ quote»
Some older prints have used „such Polish quotes“.

History

Poles adopted the Latin alphabet in the 12th century. However, that alphabet was ill-equipped to represent certain Polish sounds, such as the palatal consonants and nasal vowels. Consequently, Polish spelling in the Middle Ages was highly inconsistent, as different writers used different systems to represent these sounds, For example, in early documents the letter c could signify the sounds now written c, cz, k, while the letter z was used for the sounds now written z, ż, ś, ź. Writers soon began to experiment with digraphs (combinations of letters), new letters (φ and ſ, no longer used), and eventually diacritics.

The Polish alphabet was one of two major forms of Latin-based orthography developed for Slavic languages, the other being Czech orthography, characterized by carons (háčeks), as in the letter č. The other major Slavic languages which are now written in Latin-based alphabets (Slovak, Slovene, and Serbo-Croatian) use systems similar to the Czech. However a Polish-based orthography is used for Kashubian and usually for Silesian, while the Sorbian languages use elements of both systems.

Computer encoding
There are several different systems for encoding the Polish alphabet for computers. All letters of the Polish alphabet are included in Unicode, and thus Unicode-based encodings such as UTF-8 and UTF-16 can be used. The Polish alphabet is completely included in the Basic Multilingual Plane of Unicode. ISO 8859-2 (Latin-2), ISO 8859-13 (Latin-7), ISO 8859-16 (Latin-10) and Windows-1250 are popular 8-bit encodings that support the Polish alphabet.

The Polish letters which are not present in the English alphabet use the following HTML character entities and Unicode codepoints:

For other encodings, see the following table. Numbers in the table are hexadecimal.

A common test sentence containing all the Polish diacritic letters is the nonsensical "Zażółć gęślą jaźń".

See also
 Polish Braille
 Polish manual alphabet

Further reading

References

External links
 Polish Pronunciation Audio and Grammar Charts 
 Online editor for typing Polish characters

Orthography
!
Indo-European Latin-script orthographies